, stylized as v flower is a Vocaloid voice library produced by Gynoid Co., Ltd. The mascot character attached to the product is known as .

The song Goodbye Declaration, composed by Chinozo featuring V Flower became the most viewed VOCALOID song in history, and the most viewed song with lead vocals sung by a voice synthesizer in history, having surpassed 100 million views on YouTube in July of 2021.

Development
V Flower is an androgynous female Japanese vocal with a powerful voice designed to specialize in rock music. She debuted in HoneyWorks' song "Inokori Sensei," which was uploaded on April 17, 2014.

The download version of the original software developed for the Vocaloid 3 engine was released on May 9 and for physical release in the summer of 2014. A physical release was later confirmed to be for July 16, 2014.

Subsequent Releases
On July 16, 2015, Gynoid Co., Ltd. released a Vocaloid 4 update to V Flower called "V4 Flower". The update contained improvements to the overall vocal and included samples enabling compatibility with the vocal 'growl' feature new to that version of the Vocaloid engine.

On March 10, 2023, a CeVIO AI voice library for Flower was released, with the name "Ci flower" to reflect the different engine.

Character Design
V Flower's V4 design was originally used by the artist, Miwasiba, in July 2014. The appearance was originally created as fan art by the artist and was conceptualized as a "shota" version of Flower. The official V Flower Twitter account noted that the new Vocaloid 4 design was the "short haired" version of Flower, while the original Vocaloid 3 version was the "long haired" version of the same character. The official Twitter account said that the design was to reflect how Flower herself is now "perfect flower", having both a "pistil" (long haired version) and "stamen" (short haired version). Due to confusion caused by the comment, with responses thinking Flower was intersex, it was noted by the account that Flower has a "pistil" (female reproductive organ). The Twitter account also noted the change of hairstyle did not change her nature.

See also
 List of Vocaloid products

References

Vocaloids introduced in 2014
Fictional singers